Philip "Phil" E. Sakowitz Jr. attended Long Island University on a basketball scholarship, graduating in 1975 with a degree in physical education.

Career

Sakowitz previously held a number of positions with the Department of Defense and U.S. Army, the last four as an SES member.
2008–2010, (SES) Director and Chief Executive Officer of Defense Commissary Agency
2006–2008, (SES) Executive Director, United States Army Installation Management Command, Arlington, Virginia.
2002–2006, Deputy Director, U.S. Army Installation Management Agency, Arlington, Virginia.
2002, Director, Installation Management Transformation Task Force, Arlington, Virginia.
1998–2002, (SES) Deputy Chief of Staff, Base Operations Support, U.S. Army Training and Doctrine Command, Fort Monroe, Virginia.   In this capacity, he was responsible for installation management doctrine, policies, resources, standards and programs for fifteen major Army installations. He managed a $1.57 billion annual budget; 50+ thousand military and civilians;  of land;  of facilities worth $30 billion; $1+ billion contract support and daily base support for 150+ thousand students, active duty, reserves, civilians, and retirees.
1996–1998,  Assistant Deputy Chief of Staff for Personnel and Installation Management, U.S. Army Forces Command (FORSCOM), Fort McPherson, Georgia.   He was responsible for installation management, individual and unit personnel readiness, mobilization planning and support, oversight of a $1.3 billion BASOPS budget and overall management of base support for DOD's largest major command, composed of over 800 thousand soldiers and 30 thousand civilians.
1989–1996, Chief, Morale, Welfare and Recreation, Directorate of Personnel, U.S. Army Forces Command, Fort McPherson, Georgia.
1988–1989, Director, Program Analysis and Evaluation, U.S. Army Community and Family Support Center, Alexandria, Virginia.
1981–1988, Chief, Community Morale Services, U.S. Army Materiel Command, Alexandria, Virginia.
1981, Sports Director, New York Area Command and Fort Hamilton, New York
1978–1980, Youth Activities Director, Fitzsimons Army Medical Center, Colorado.
1975–1978, Youth Activities Director, Fort Monmouth, New Jersey

References

External links
  at 2008 AUSA Conference

LIU Brooklyn Blackbirds men's basketball players
Living people
1953 births

Heads of United States federal agencies
United States Department of Defense officials
People from Peachtree City, Georgia
Sportspeople from the Atlanta metropolitan area